Bernat Guillermo was bishop of Urgell in Northern Spain from 1072-1092.

He was 	Appointed Bishop of Urgell, in Rome on 15 Jan 1076, by Pope Gregory VII, succeeding Bishop Guillem Guifredo. Very little is known of the details of his episcopate.

References 

Bishops of Urgell
Year of birth missing
Year of death missing
11th-century Roman Catholic bishops in Spain